Route 175 is a -long mostly east–west secondary highway in southwest New Brunswick, Canada.

Route description
The route's eastern terminus is at Route 1 (exit 86) north-east of Lepreau, New Brunswick. The road travels south to the western terminus of Route 795 and the northern terminus of Route 790 and becomes Lepreau Village Rd as it enters Lepreau after crossing the Lepreau River. The route then turns south-west on the Lepreau Village Road as it enters Lepreau. Continuing south-west, the route passes the eastern terminus of Route 780 then Mink Brook, Haggertys Cove then New River Beach crosses the New River and passes New River Beach Provincial Park. The route continues through Pocologan after crossing the Pocologan River passing Crow Harbour as it passes Crow River. The route then turn north-west as it crosses Route 1 (exit 69) as it enters Pennfield Station. The route then passes through Pennfield Ridge as it enters Pennfield ending  at the intersection of Route 785 and Route 176.

History
This former section of Route 1 was once the main highway from Lepreau to Pennfield until October 2012 when the new 4 lane highway 
was opened and became Route 1.

References

175
175
2012 establishments in New Brunswick